Bayan Lewis (born February 25, 1942) was interim Chief of the Los Angeles Police Department in 1997.

Education 

Graduate of Pepperdine University in public administration, with postgraduate work at USC; also graduated from the Army Command and General Staff College at Ft. Leavenworth, Kansas

Career 

After retirement, Lewis became chief of the Los Angeles County Office of Public Safety.  Lewis again retired in 2005 and was replaced by former LAPD deputy chief Margaret York.

Lewis joined the LAPD in April 1963. Reaching the rank of captain, he headed the anti-terrorist division for the Rampart and West Valley areas, and the west traffic division. As assistant chief, he served as director of the Office of Operations, responsible for 85% of the department's resources. He served in the 40th Infantry Division (Mechanized) of the California National Guard for 23 years, retiring as lieutenant colonel.

He served as director of the Office of Operations and was responsible for the department's largest command. Lewis was instrumental in creating the department's mobile field force.

Police chief 

He was appointed by the LAPD commission on March 31, 1997.  Prior to this, he had served in the department for 34 years.  Lewis said he was uninterested in the permanent position. He served as director of the Office of Operations and was responsible for the department's largest command. Lewis was instrumental in creating the department's mobile field force.

Lewis took the position May 18, 1997, two months before the July 6 date Willie L. Williams was supposed to step down.

References

Chiefs of the Los Angeles Police Department
Pepperdine University alumni
USC Sol Price School of Public Policy alumni
United States Army Command and General Staff College alumni
1942 births
Living people